Glenn Leigh Gray (December 7, 1924 – September 5, 2011) was a Canadian curler. He played as third on the 1954 Brier-winning Team Alberta, skipped by Matt Baldwin.

References

1924 births
2011 deaths
Brier champions
Canadian male curlers
Curlers from Alberta
People from Drumheller
Curlers from Regina, Saskatchewan